Nodar Georgiyevich Khokhashvili (born 28 September 1940) is a retired Georgian freestyle wrestler who won a bronze medal in the featherweight division at the 1964 Olympics. His silver medal match against Stancho Kolev ended in a draw, and the preference was given to Kolev because of his lower body weight.

After the Olympics, Khokhashvili moved to the lightweight category and won medals at the 1969 European Championships and 1969 World Championships. Domestically, he won one Soviet lightweight title in 1969.

References

1940 births
Living people
Sportspeople from Tbilisi
Soviet male sport wrestlers
Olympic wrestlers of the Soviet Union
Wrestlers at the 1964 Summer Olympics
Male sport wrestlers from Georgia (country)
Olympic bronze medalists for the Soviet Union
Olympic medalists in wrestling
World Wrestling Championships medalists
Medalists at the 1964 Summer Olympics
European Wrestling Championships medalists